Inbenta is an AI company that originated in Barcelona, Spain, in 2005. Inbenta is currently headquartered in Foster City, California, with offices in: São Paulo, Brazil; Toulouse, France; and Tokyo, Japan. Inbenta raised $12 Million in their Series B funding round to extend the reach of their artificial intelligence for business solutions.

Inbenta provides natural language processing and semantic search through artificial intelligence.

Controversy
On 23 June 2018, Ticketmaster UK identified malicious software on a customer support product hosted by Inbenta Technologies, compromising personal data and payment details for thousands of Ticketmaster customers. On June 26, 2018, Inbenta's CEO Issued a message about the incident to convey the full scope of the breach. Also on its FAQ section, Inbenta claimed that "After a careful analysis of all clues and snapshots from our systems, the technical team at Inbenta discovered that the script had been implemented on the payment page. We were unaware of this, and would have advised against doing so had we known, as it presents a point of vulnerability". On November 13, 2020, the Information Commissioner's Office fined Ticketmaster UK Limited £1.25 million for failing to protect customers' payment details. According to the ICO, "It was because of Ticketmaster's business decision to include the [Inbenta] chat bot on its payment page that the chat bot was able to unlawfully process the personal data of customers."

References

External links 
 

Search engine software
Internet search engines
Software companies of the United States
Software companies established in 2005
Companies established in 2005
2005 establishments in California
2005 establishments in the United States